Word Ways: The Journal of Recreational Linguistics is a quarterly magazine on recreational linguistics, logology and word play. It was established by Dmitri Borgmann in 1968 at the behest of Martin Gardner. Howard Bergerson took over as editor-in-chief for 1969, but stepped down when Greenwood Periodicals dropped the publication. A. Ross Eckler Jr., a statistician at Bell Labs, became editor until 2006, when he was succeeded by Jeremiah Farrell (Butler University).

Word Ways was the first periodical devoted exclusively to word play, and has become the foremost publication in that field. Lying "on the midpoint of a spectrum from popular magazine to scholarly journal", it publishes articles on various linguistic oddities and creative use of language. This includes research into and demonstrations of anagrams, pangrams, lipograms, tautonyms, univocalics, word ladders, palindromes and unusually long words, as well as book reviews, literature surveys, investigations into questionable logological claims, puzzles and quizzes, mnemonics and a small measure of linguistically oriented fiction.

Willard R. Espy discovered Word Ways in 1972, and eventually used material from several dozen articles in his Almanac of Words at Play anthologies. The first of these included complete subscription details for Word Ways, which generated so many inquiries that for decades the publishers were reluctant to change their address.

In the November 2020 issue, editor Jeremiah Farrell announced that the publication of Word Ways would be suspended.

Current editorial board 
 Editor: Jeremiah Farrell, Butler University
 Lacey Echols, Butler University
 Kirstin L. Ellsworth, South Pasadena, California
 Barbara Howes, Butler University
 Katie Mohr, Wiley Publishing Company
 David D. Wright, Hangzhou, China
 Electronic Journal Publishing Assistant: Laina Ridenour, Butler University

See also 
 Dave Morice, former editor

References

External links
 Official website, including free online back issues and abstracts of recent issues

Butler University
Literary magazines published in the United States
Magazines established in 1968
Magazines published in Indianapolis
Quarterly magazines published in the United States
Word games